Silanus of Ambracia was an ancient Greek soothsayer in Xenophon's Anabasis. In 401 BC, he accompanied Cyrus the Younger in an expedition against Artaxerxes. When Silanus provided Cyrus with a successful prediction, he was rewarded with 3000 darics (or 10 talents).

References

Sources

5th-century BC clergy
Ancient Greek seers
Ancient Epirotes
Anabasis (Xenophon)
People from the Achaemenid Empire